Datangshan is the name of a hill in the Changping District of Beijing, China.

Transportation

 N 6th Ring Road
 Beijing Metro Changping Line

Attractions

It is the site of China's largest aviation museum, the China Aviation Museum.

 Jiuhua Resort and Convention Centre
 Xiaotangshan Hot Springs

Landforms of Beijing
Changping District
Hills of China